The Adventures of Mr. Nicholas Wisdom (in English, more accurately, The Adventures of Nicholas Empiricus), written in Polish in 1776 by Ignacy Krasicki, is the first novel composed in the Polish language, and a milestone in Polish literature.

Plot
Krasicki's novel is the tale of Nicholas Experience (Mikołaj Doświadczyński), a Polish nobleman. During sojourns in Warsaw, Paris, and the fictional island of Nipu (a utopian society), the protagonist gathers numerous experiences that lead him to a rationalist outlook and teach him how to become a good man, and thus a good citizen. This rationalist outlook, often emphasized in Krasicki's writings, constitutes an apologia for the Enlightenment and physiocratism. 
The Adventures of Nicholas Experience offers a portrayal both of the 18th-century Polish–Lithuanian Commonwealth and of the broader European culture of the time.

See also

 Fables and Parables

References

Further reading
 The Adventures of Mr. Nicholas Wisdom, Northwestern University Press, 1992, 148 pp.,

External links 
 Polish ebook
 Short review of an English translation

1776 novels
Polish novels
Novels by Ignacy Krasicki
1770s fantasy novels
18th-century Polish novels
Works by Ignacy Krasicki
Utopian novels
Polish Enlightenment